Spall are fragments of a material that are broken off a larger solid body.

Spall may also refer to:

 Spall, Germany, a municipality

People with the surname
 Rafe Spall (born 1983), English actor
 Robert Spall (1890–1918), Canadian recipient of the Victoria Cross
 Timothy Spall (born 1957), English actor